Khmyzovka is a rural locality (a settlement) in Alexeyevsky District, Belgorod Oblast, Russia. The population was 132 as of 2010. There are 2 streets.

Geography 
Khmyzovka is located 44 km southeast of Alexeyevka (the district's administrative centre) by road. Kalitva is the nearest rural locality.

References 

Rural localities in Alexeyevsky District, Belgorod Oblast
Biryuchensky Uyezd